Little Crosby is a small village in Merseyside, North West England. Despite being a suburb within 8 miles of Liverpool it has retained its rural character by, for example, opting not to have street lights.

As part of Lancashire the village was an urban district in its own right until annexed to the Great Crosby urban district in 1932. This urban district was combined with other districts to form the municipal borough of Crosby in 1937. This in turn was absorbed into the new Metropolitan Borough of Sefton in 1974.

The village is perhaps the oldest extant Roman Catholic village in England, the squires being the notable recusant Blundell family. The village character has changed little from a 17th-century description that "it had not a beggar, ... an alehouse ... [or] a Protestant in it...".

Notable attractions are:
 The Courtyard café
 Crosby Hall Educational Trust (CHET) an educational, residential centre for children and young people.
 The Well Barn, an attractive courtyard which has various small shops and businesses including a jewellery shop, florist, conservationist restorer and furniture makers

The village is dominated by the St Mary's Roman Catholic Church, inspired by Augustus Pugin. Opposite the church is St. Mary's Roman Catholic School, a single storey 1960s building. The first school for the village was established by the Squire, William Blundell, at Boundary Cottage in 1843, next to the brook that then ran between Great Crosby and Little Crosby. In 1859 the school moved to a new building next to the presbytery of the church, opposite the current site. The current school building replaced that in 1964. The school takes pupils from the village and neighbouring villages of Hightown and Ince Blundell.

Governance
From 1950 until 2010 Little Crosby was within the boundaries of the Crosby constituency, whose Member of Parliament (MP)from 1997 till 2010 was Claire Curtis-Thomas, a member of the Labour Party, prior to her election the Crosby seat was generally considered to be a safe Conservative Party stronghold with Tory MP's elected at every election barring the 1981 Crosby by-election where Shirley Williams of the Social Democratic Party was elected to represent the constituency. As a result of boundary revisions for the 2010 general election the Crosby constituency was abolished with its northern parts, including Little Crosby, being merged with the Eastern parts of Sefton that were formerly part of the Knowsley North and Sefton East constituency, to form the new constituency of Sefton Central, which is currently represented by the Labour Party MP Bill Esterson.

For elections to Sefton Council Little Crosby is within the Manor electoral ward and is represented by three councillors.  The councillors of Manor ward are Martyn Barber of the Conservative Party, John Gibson of the Liberal Democrats, and Steve McGinnity of the Labour Party.

See also
Listed buildings in Little Crosby

References

External links 

Little Crosby in Bloom – The website of Little Crosby's villagers' entry into North West in Bloom
MerseySights: Outlying areas – website with photos of the village
St. Mary's, Little Crosby – website of the parish church, with history of the village
Little Crosby Church: St. Mary's – Anna Tumilty's site on the church history and parish records of Little Crosby
Township: Little Crosby – from A History of the County of Lancaster, Vol.3, published in 1907
Crosby Records: A CHAPTER OF LANCASHIRE RECUSANCY – An 1887 monograph on the Blundells and Little Crosby
Little Crosby restorers – The website of Little Crosby's traditional cabinetmakers
Accessories Online – the website for Little Crosby's jewellery shop set inside a converted barn

Towns and villages in the Metropolitan Borough of Sefton